Menhaniam  is a village in Kozhikode district in the state of Kerala, India.

Demographics
 India census, Menhaniam had a population of 15238 with 7436 males and 7802 females.

Transportation
Menhaniam village connects to other parts of India through Koyilandy town.  The nearest airports are at Kannur and Kozhikode.  The nearest railway station is at Koyiandy.  The national highway no.66 passes through Koyilandy and the northern stretch connects to Mangalore, Goa and Mumbai.  The southern stretch connects to Cochin and Trivandrum.  The eastern National Highway No.54 going through Kuttiady connects to Mananthavady, Mysore and Bangalore.

References

Koyilandy area